Futureperfect is the fourth studio album by the German-based alternative electronic band VNV Nation. It was released in Europe on 28 January 2002 and on 5 March 2002 in the United States. It was the first VNV Nation release to be created/produced entirely using software synthesizers. The opening track 'Foreword' samples the Enigma Variations, part IX (Nimrod).

It charted at No. 26 in the mainstream German charts, charting for two weeks.

"Genesis" and "Beloved" were released as singles.

Track listing

Personnel
 Ronan Harris: vocals, song-writing, composition and Production

Release history

References

2002 albums
VNV Nation albums